Carl Günther Ludovici (or Ludewig) (7 August 1707 in Leipzig – 5 July 1778 in Leipzig) was a German philosopher, lexicographer and economist.
He edited a large part of the Grosses vollständiges Universal-Lexicon, a major German encyclopedia of the 18th century.

Life

Ludovici was born 7 August 1707 in Leipzig, son of Christian Ludovici (1663–1732), professor of philosophy at the University of Leipzig, theologian and Orientalist.
His father had him taught by tutors from the age of two. He attended the Thomas school, where he studied with Paul Daniel Longolius. 
In 1724 he began studies in philosophy and theology at the University of Leipzig, where he gained a Master's degree in 1728. In 1733, he became a full professor of practical philosophy at the university.

In 1739, Johann Heinrich Zedler appointed Ludovici editor of his Grosses Universal-Lexicon (Great Universal Lexicon), and he served until 1754 as chief editor of Volumes 19-64 and the supplement Volumes 1 to 4 of the largest German encyclopedia project of the 18th Century. 
In 1761 Ludovici became professor of Aristotelian logic. From 1765 - 1766 Ludovici was Rector of the University of Leipzig and at the same time Dean of the Faculty of Arts.
Ludovici was a member of the Prussian Academy of Sciences and the Leipzig Society of economics, the liberal arts and the German language. He was also a member of the College of the principality College, warden of the calendar system and archivist at the University of Leipzig.

Work

Ludovici's primary work as a professor was the presentation and interpretation of the philosophical teachings of Christian Wolff  and Gottfried Wilhelm Leibniz. 
He published two extensive articles which sparked heated debate in the learned world.
He received complaints from professors at the University of Halle, but was led into a lively correspondence with other scholars of his time.

As editor, Ludovici introduced several innovations in the Great Universal Lexicon and a significantly increased its quality. 
He made the bibliography at the end of each article more complete, made articles much longer and introduced biographies of living people.
His prefaces to the volumes 19, 21, 23 and the first volume of the supplements are important lexicographical sources. 
The extensive article on Christian Wolff and the Wolffian philosophy are almost certainly his work.

While editing Zedler's Universal Lexicon, Ludovici made a German translation from the French of the Dictionaire de commerce of Jacques Savary des Brûlons, which was published as the General Treasure Chamber between 1741-1743. 
From this work grew the Open Academy of Merchants, a more complete lexicon of commerce whose five volumes published by Zedler's partner Johann Samuel Heinsius began to appear in 1752 and were completed in 1756.
It is the first complete German-language trade lexicon, with the last volume providing a systematic plan of this discipline. 
The lexicon was used in practice, as shown by the sales to commercial firms.

Partial bibliography

References

Further reading
 

 

1707 births
1778 deaths
German encyclopedists
Writers from Leipzig
German lexicographers
German male non-fiction writers
18th-century lexicographers